In mathematics, Jordan's inequality, named after Camille Jordan, states that

 

It can be proven through the geometry of circles (see drawing).

Notes

Further reading
Serge Colombo: Holomorphic Functions of One Variable. Taylor & Francis 1983, p. 167-168 (online copy)
Da-Wei Niu, Jian Cao, Feng Qi: Generealizations of Jordan's Inequality and Concerned Relations. U.P.B. Sci. Bull., Series A, Volume 72, Issue 3, 2010, 
Feng Qi: Jordan's Inequality: Refinements, Generealizations, Applications and related Problems.  RGMIA Res Rep Coll (2006), Volume: 9, Issue: 3, Pages: 243–259
Meng-Kuang Kuo: Refinements of Jordan's inequality. Journal of Inequalities and Applications 2011, 2011:130, doi:10.1186/1029-242X-2011-130

External links
Jordan's inequality at the Proof Wiki
Jordan's and Kober's inequalities at cut-the-knot.org

Inequalities